Hruboňovo is a village and municipality in the Nitra District in western central Slovakia, in the Nitra Region.

History
In historical records the village was first mentioned in 1247.

Geography
The village lies at an altitude of 155 metres and covers an area of 11.551 km². It has a population of about 485 people.

Ethnicity
According to population data for 2011, the city has a population of 508 people.

The village is approximately 100% Slovak.

Facilities
The village has a public library and football pitch.

See also
 List of municipalities and towns in Slovakia

References

Genealogical resources

The records for genealogical research are available at the state archive "Statny Archiv in Nitra, Slovakia"

External links
https://web.archive.org/web/20071217080336/http://www.statistics.sk/mosmis/eng/run.html
Surnames of living people in Hrubonovo

Villages and municipalities in Nitra District